Dyspropterin (6-pyruvoyltetrahydropterin, 6-PTHB) is an intermediate in tetrahydrobiopterin biosynthesis. It is the product of the enzyme 6-pyruvoyltetrahydropterin synthase and the substrate of two enzymes, 6-pyruvoyltetrahydropterin 2'-reductase and sepiapterin reductase.

Dyspropterin exists in all living organisms, ranging from bacteria to humans. Dyspropterin has been detected, but not quantified in, a few different foods, such as anatidaes (Anatidae), chickens (Gallus gallus), and domestic pigs (Sus scrofa domestica). This could make dyspropterin a potential biomarker for the consumption of these foods.

See also 
 Tetrahydrobiopterin

References 

Pteridines